HD 125288 is a single star in the southern constellation of Centaurus. It has the Bayer designation v Centauri (lower case V); while HD 125288 is the star's identifier in the Henry Draper catalogue. The object has a blue-white hue and is faintly visible to the naked eye with an apparent visual magnitude of 4.30. Based on parallax measurements, it is located at a distance of approximately 1,230 light years from the Sun. This is a candidate runaway star that is moving to the west and falling back into the Galactic plane. It has an absolute magnitude of −3.56.

This massive B-type supergiant star has a stellar classification of B5Ib/II or B6Ib. It is around 37 million years old and has 8 times the mass of the Sun. The star has expanded to 19 times the girth of the Sun and is spinning with a projected rotational velocity of 23 km/s. It is radiating 806 times the luminosity of the Sun from its photosphere at an effective temperature of 7,081 K.

In 2016, an asterism including HD 125288 (SAO 241641) was unofficially identified in honor of David Bowie.

References 

B-type supergiants
Centaurus (constellation)
Centauri, v
Durchmusterung objects
125288
070069
5358